The 1929–30 season was the 21st in the history of the Isthmian League, an English football competition.

At the end of the previous season Civil Service resigned from the league. They were replaced by Kingstonian, switched from the Athenian League. Nunhead were champions for the second season in a row.

League table

References

Isthmian League seasons
I